Charles Sargent may refer to:

 Charles Sprague Sargent, American botanist
 Charles Sargent (politician) (1943–2018), American politician
 Charles Sargent (judge), British Indian Judge